Sir Edwin Mitchelson  (7 April 1846 – 11 April 1934) was a New Zealand politician and timber merchant.

Member of Parliament

Mitchelson was born in Auckland in a cottage on Queen Street in the mid 1840s. He developed business interests in timber and kauri gum, shipbuilding, and horse racing and breeding. He was a cabinet minister from 1883 to 1884 and 1887 to 1880 as Minister of Public Works. From 1887 to 1891 he was Minister of Māori Affairs (called Native Affairs), and from 1889 to 1891 he was Minister of Telegraphs and Postmaster-General.

Later years
Mitchelson was the Mayor of Auckland City from 1903 to 1905, chairman of the Remuera Road Board, and a member of the Legislative Council from 1920 until his death on 11 April 1934. He was appointed a Knight Commander of the Order of St Michael and St George in the 1921 King's Birthday Honours. He was buried at Purewa Cemetery in the Auckland suburb of Meadowbank.

Notes

References

|-

|-

1846 births
1934 deaths
Mayors of Auckland
Members of the Cabinet of New Zealand
Members of the New Zealand House of Representatives
Members of the New Zealand Legislative Council
New Zealand MPs for Auckland electorates
New Zealand MPs for North Island electorates
New Zealand Knights Commander of the Order of St Michael and St George
19th-century New Zealand politicians
New Zealand politicians awarded knighthoods
Auckland Harbour Board members
Burials at Purewa Cemetery